Ware Junior Senior High School (WJSHS) is a public school serving grades 7–12 for the Ware School District in Ware, Massachusetts.

History
The old Ware High School building was erected in 1893 and is part of the Church Street Historic District.

Athletics
The Ware Indians are part of the Pioneer Valley Interscholastic Athletic Conference. School colors are green and white. It has a baseball team, a football team, and a cheerleading squad. In 2009, the school's football team won the Division 4 Western Massachusetts Super Bowl.

The now-defunct Holyoke Hurricanes played their Independent Women's Football League home games at the school in 2008 and 2009.

Notable alumni
Tracy Brown-May, member of the Nevada Assembly
Billy Jo Robidoux, Major League Baseball player

See also
 List of secondary school sports team names and mascots derived from indigenous peoples

References

Ware, Massachusetts
Schools in Hampshire County, Massachusetts
Public high schools in Massachusetts
Educational institutions established in 1893
1893 establishments in Massachusetts